Sir John Grimley Evans  (17 September 1936 – 26 March 2018) was a British gerontologist.

Early life and education
Grimley Evans was born in Birmingham to Harry Walter Grimley Evans and Violet Prenter Walker on 17 September 1936. He attended King Edward's School, Birmingham, and studied at St John's College, Cambridge and Balliol College, Oxford.

Career
Grimley Evans worked with Donald Acheson before joining the London School of Hygiene and Tropical Medicine as a lecturer. Subsequently, he taught at Newcastle University and the University of Oxford. Grimley Evans served as editor of the journal Age and Ageing from 1988 to 1995.

Awards and honours
Grimley Evans was elected a Fellow of the Academy of Medical Sciences (FMedSci) in 1998 and was knighted in the 1997 Birthday Honours.

Personal life
Grimley Evans died at the age of 81 on 26 March 2018.

References

1936 births
2018 deaths
Academics of the University of Oxford
British gerontologists
Medical journal editors
Academics of Newcastle University
Academics of the London School of Hygiene & Tropical Medicine
Fellows of the Academy of Medical Sciences (United Kingdom)
Knights Bachelor
People educated at King Edward's School, Birmingham
Alumni of St John's College, Cambridge
Alumni of Balliol College, Oxford
People from Birmingham, West Midlands
Fellows of the Royal College of Physicians